Gobiopsis springeri, Springer's barbelgoby, is a species of goby found in the Western Central Pacific Ocean.

Size

Etymology
The fish is named in honor of Victor G. Springer (b. 1928), the Curator of Fishes, of the U.S. National Museum, who collected the type specimen.

References

Gobiidae
Taxa named by Ernest A. Lachner
Taxa named by James F. McKinney
Fish described in 1979